The rivière du Sud (in English: South River) is a tributary of the south bank of the North Eaton River whose current flows successively into the Eaton River, the Saint-François River, then the south shore of the St. Lawrence River.

The Rivière du Sud flows through the municipalities of Saint-Mathias-de-Bonneterre and Newport, in the Le Haut-Saint-François Regional County Municipality (MRC), in the administrative region of Estrie, in Quebec, in Canada.

Geography 

The neighboring hydrographic slopes of the South River are:
 north side: North Eaton River, Ditton Creek West;
 east side: North Eaton River, Poilu Creek, Mining Creek;
 south side: Canada-US border;
 west side: Lyon stream, Eaton River, North Eaton River.

The South River takes its source from a small mountain lake surrounded by marshes. This lake is located in the eastern part of the municipality of Saint-Mathias-de-Bonneterre (almost at the limit of Chartierville).

From its source, the South River descends on  towards the south entirely in a forest zone, with a drop of  according to the following segments:
  first east along the border, then north, to route 210;
  north-west, to its mouth. Note: A forest road runs along this segment.

Toponymy 

The toponym Rivière du Sud was formalized on December 5, 1968, at the Commission de toponymie du Québec.

See also 

 List of rivers of Quebec

References 

Le Haut-Saint-François Regional County Municipality
Rivers of Estrie